The Men's individual table tennis - Class 6 tournament at the 2012 Summer Paralympics in London took place from 30 August to 2 September 2012 at ExCeL Exhibition Centre. Classes 6–10 are for athletes with a physical impairment who compete from a standing position; the lower the number, the greater the impact the impairment has on an athlete’s ability to compete.

In the preliminary stage, athletes competed in four groups of three. Winners of each group qualified for the quarter-finals, joined by four seeded players.

Seeds
All seeds received a bye into the quarter-finals.

Results
All times are local (BST/UTC+1)

Finals

Preliminary round

Group A

30 August, 11:40

30 August, 19:20

31 August, 18:00

Group B

30 August, 11:40

30 August, 19:20

31 August, 18:00

Group C

30 August, 11:40

30 August, 20:00

31 August, 18:00

Group D

30 August, 11:40

30 August, 20:00

31 August, 18:00

References

MI06